

References 

https://iuhoosiers.com/documents/2021/10/5/2021_22_Indiana_Women_s_Basketball_Media_Guide.pdf
https://iuhoosiers.com/sports/2015/6/29/WBB_0629154758.aspx

http://www.espn.com/womens-college-basketball/conferences/standings/_/id/7/big-ten-conference

https://iuhoosiers.com/sports/womens-basketball/schedule

Indiana Hoosiers women's basketball seasons
Indiana Hoosiers basketball seasons